Campus for Finance Association is a student association at the WHU – Otto Beisheim School of Management in Vallendar, Germany. It was founded in 2001 in cooperation with the Endowed Chair of Finance, held by Prof. Dr. Markus Rudolf, to support and organize the student-run “Campus for Finance”-conferences. The association annually hosts the “WHU New Year’s Conference” and the “WHU Private Equity Conference”. The mission of the association is entitled “Uniting the World of Finance”.

History
Campus for Finance started as a student initiative in 2001 and organized the first “WHU New Year’s Conference”, entitled “Old/New Economy – One Finance”, in the same year. The conference is intended as a platform for mutual exchange at the contact point of academic work and practice. In addition to the “WHU New Year’s Conference” the “WHU Private Equity Conference” was launched in 2004 and deals with topics around private equity and venture capital.

Conferences 
The “WHU New Year’s Conference” and the “WHU Private Equity Conference” share the same concept: A program over two days that provides a forum for presentations and discussions of academics, corporate and media representatives, politicians and students.

WHU New Year's Conference (NYC) 

The “WHU New Year's Conference” is the biggest conference organized by the Campus for Finance Association with ca. 500 participants. It takes place annually in January and covers topics that refer to the current issues of the financial world. Due to the rising number of participants the “WHU New Year’s Conference” took place at the Rhein-Mosel-Halle in Koblenz in 2014 for the first time.

Topics of former conferences 
 "Global Shocks – Can Financial Systems Save the Real Economy?", 2021
"Big Banks, Low Margins – What is the Future of Banking?", 2020
"Next Generation Finance: The Landscape is Changing – Are You?", 2019
"Omnipresent Uncertainty – Chasing the Narrow Path Between Risk and Opportunity", 2018
"Innovation in Finance – Shaping Tomorrow's Business Models", 2017
 "Financing European Business - Where does the Future of Corporate and Institutional Funding lie", 2016
 "Cheap Money – Easy Borrowing, Tough Investing?", 2015
 "Tomorrow's Financial Services – Breakdown or Revival?", 2014
 "Financial Markets, Media & Politics: Who rules the world?", 2013
 "Sustainable Finance – How to benefit from global mega trends?!", 2012
 "Financial vs. Real Economy – Two Sides of the Same Coin?", 2011
 “Finance 2020 – Perspectives on Tomorrow’s Markets”, 2010
 “Behavioral Finance – How to Account for Irrationality?”, 2009
 “New Horizons for Financial Markets – Investing in a Changing World” 2008
 "Future of Banking – Between Markets and Institutions", 2007
 "Fixed Income – Lending, Borrowing and Taking Risk", 2006
 "Options and Futures: How Derivatives Shape Corporate Risk Management", 2005
 "Corporate Finance - How to Create Value", 2004
 "Rationality of Stock Markets & Empirical Finance", 2003
 "Asset Management & Asset Pricing", 2002
 "Old/New Economy - One Finance", 2001

WHU Private Equity Conference (PEC) 

The WHU Private Equity Conference  takes place annually in spring and is organized by students of the  WHU – Otto Beisheim School of Management. The focus lies on topics around changes in the private equity and venture capital industry. During the conference graduates and students come together with executives from funds, financial institutions, consultancies and lawyers to discuss present topics.

Topics of former conferences 
"Lessons Learned: How Will Private Equity Benefit From a Globally Changing Reality?", 2021
"Private Capital – Equity and Beyond: Finding Value in Alternative Investment Strategies", 2020
"Higher Volumes, Fewer Transactions – How to Stand Out From the Crowd in a Saturating Market?", 2019
"Falling Apart or Growing Together – Is Crisis-Shattered Europe Still Worth the Investment?", 2018
"Growth Driver of the New Normal? – Exploring the Impact of Alternative Investments on Innovation and Economic Growth", 2017
"Performance Differentiation Through Operational Value Creation" und "Replacing Capital Markets Through Private Growth Investors?!", 2016
 "Circling Around the same Targets", "The Changing Role of LPs" and "From Profitability to Growth", 2015
 "Private Equity Growing Up – Value Creation Strategies in a Maturing Market", 2014
 "Heading for new Shores – Crisis as a Chance", 2013
 "Private Equity 2.0 – Redefining the industry’s chessboard", 2012
 "Value Creation - Exploiting this Decade’s Opportunities", 2011

List of former speakers (selection) 
 Wolfgang Schäuble, Federal Minister of Finance of Germany
 Sir John Major, former Prime Minister of the United Kingdom 
 Brady W. Dougan, CEO Credit Suisse
 Oswald Grübel, former CEO of Credit Suisse and UBS
 Dame Clara Furse, former CEO of the London Stock Exchange
 Jean-Claude Trichet, president of the European Central Bank
 John Forbes Nash, Jr., Princeton University, Nobel Prize 1994
 Reinhard Selten, University of Bonn, Nobel Prize 1994
 Finn E. Kydland, University of California, Santa Barbara, Nobel Prize 2004
 Robert Aumann, Hebrew University of Jerusalem, Nobel Prize 2005
 Hans-Paul Bürkner, CEO Boston Consulting Group
 Alexander Dibelius, CEO Germany, Austria, Russia and Central and Eastern Europe Goldman Sachs
 Eckhard Cordes, CEO Haniel and Metro Group
 Axel A. Weber, president of the Bundesbank
 Jochen Sanio, president of the German Federal Financial Supervisory Authority (BaFin)
 Peter Wuffli, former CEO UBS
 Hilmar Kopper, former CEO Deutsche Bank AG
 Paul Achleitner, chairman Deutsche Bank AG

Scientific reception 
A number of contributions from the series "Campus for Finance" were apprehended in the scientific discussion. For example, the paper "How to Pay a Non-family Manager in a Family Firm - a Multi-task Principal-agent Analysis" by Jörn Block and Joachim Henkel at the "Campus for Finance - Research Conference 2009" on the pricing models of management taken. The lecture "Rational International Investment" by Campbell Harvey held on the "WHU New Year's Conference 2003" was discussed further.

Media reception 
At the "WHU New Year's Conference 2010" Alexander Dibelius, head of the investment bank Goldman Sachs Germany, said that "Banks ... have no obligation to promote the common good." For this he earned considerable criticism, both from politicians and society as well as colleagues and generated considerable media coverage. Especially in connection with the intensive bailout for the banking industry around the world due to the international financial crisis, this statement is highly controversial. The speech by Axel Wieandt was intensively discussed, too, as he spoke about the plans of Hypo Real Estate to establish a "bad bank”. The attendance of John F. Nash, Jr. earned the conference high media interest, which was reported of in newspaper articles and in numerous interviews.

See also 
 EBS Symposium
 Mannheim Forum

External links
Homepage Campus for Finance
Homepage WHU - Otto Beisheim School of Management

Reception 

 Andreas Buhr: Finanzkongress Campus for Finance wählt für 2010 bedeutende Redner, Online Artikel, 7. Januar 2010, New Year's Conference 2010 Online
 Handelsblatt: Verschnaufpause für Banken geht 2010 zu Ende, Handelsblatt, 18. Januar 2010, New Year's Conference 2010 Online
 wiwi-Journal: Campus for Finance – New Year's Conference 2009, wiwi-Journal, 11.2008, Seite 52/53, New Year's Conference 2009
 Handelsblatt: Ackermann erklärt die Welt von Morgen, Handelsblatt, 17. Januar 2008, New Year's Conference 2008 Online
 Onvista: Investing in a Changing World, Onvista, 7. August 2010 (updated), New Year's Conference 2008 Online
 Mathias Peer: Banken sparen nicht am Nachwuchs - Das Finanzgewerbe wird immer akademischer, Hochschulanzeiger no. 95, 2008, page 38, New Year's Conference 2008 Online
 Manager Magazin: Eine Million Neukunden bis Dezember, Manager Magazin, 12. Januar 2007 New Year's Conference 2007 Online
 Jörg Hilpert: Die internationale Finanzwelt versammelt sich in Vallendar, Rhein Zeitung, 13. Januar 2006, page 7, New Year's Conference 2006
 UNICUM: Zukunft der Finanzwelt, UNICUM, 13. Dezember 2004, no. 12, page 36, New Year's Conference 2005
 Christiane Buck: Herkömmliche Bewertung nicht sinnvoll, Welt, 21. Januar 2001, New Year's Conference 2001 Online

References 

Business conferences
International conferences in Germany